Embrace is a public art work by artist Sorel Etrog located at the Lynden Sculpture Garden near Milwaukee, Wisconsin. The abstract sculpture is made of bronze; it is installed on a base on the lawn.

References

1966 sculptures
Outdoor sculptures in Milwaukee
Bronze sculptures in Wisconsin
1966 establishments in Wisconsin